Protapnagar Union is a union parishad in Assasuni Upazila of Satkhira District, in Khulna Division, Bangladesh.

Pratapnagar is a village in the south-western part of Bangladesh near the Sundarbans in Assasuni Upazila, Satkhira District. The village is surrounded by big rivers and numerous canals. Pratapnagar is named after Raja Pratapaditya.

Pratapnagar Jame Mosque (1703) is dated back to Mughal Emperor Aurangzeb.

See also
 List of villages in Bangladesh

References

Unions of Assasuni Upazila
Populated places in Khulna Division
Villages in Satkhira District
Villages in Khulna Division